Balloon Land, also known as The Pincushion Man, is a 1935 animated short film produced by Ub Iwerks as part of the ComiColor Cartoons series. The cartoon is about a place called Balloon Land, whose residents (including caricatures of popular entertainment figures such as Laurel and Hardy and Charlie Chaplin) are made entirely out of balloons. The villain in the cartoon is the Pincushion Man, a character who walks around Balloon Land popping the inhabitants with pins.

Plot
The cartoon starts with a short tour of Balloon Land featuring an entire population of balloon people and animals. After a very short tour of people working near and around the town, it demonstrated an experimental human-making machine that makes humans. An employee was seen filling up the air on two kids, which were a boy and a girl. While the girl gets filled up, the employee warned the little boy to watch out for the Pincushion Man. Without incident, the boy immediately denied the warning saying that he is not afraid of him, but the girl does not want to get killed by him. He angrily took the girl with her, and they both walked into the balloon forest. After jumping over a huge gate, they see the darkness. While looking around, a large gray and red tree that resembles an owl scares them away, sending the kids running until crashing into a brown and green tree across the pathway. With the boy faking that he is not scared at all, the tree almost grabbed the girl with the branch that resembles a hand, but the boy swipes it in time to escape. Meanwhile, we then see the Pincushion Man hiding behind a rock until popping it. He describes himself as the "Terror of Balloon Land" while popping flowers, rocks, and trees. The two kids continued to walk through the forest. The boy describes the Pincushion Man as a fake person. The Pincushion Man was just inches away from the kids, and after standing on a pathway, he turns around and saw the two kids walking. He immediately hides behind a green and red tree and immediately scares the kids. While the kids' huddle in fear, he grabs one of the needles and tries to poke the kids with it but misses. Trying to get the target, the kids immediately avoid the needle that was held by the Pincushion Man which instead popped four cherries on a brown tree. The Pincushion Man then began chasing the kids but gets swiped by a small colorful tree which sends him flying backward and causing a short daze. After the kids passed by the owl tree from earlier, they jumped over the huge gate just in time for the Pincushion Man to ram over and crash into the locked door. In frustration, he bangs on the door wanting to come into Balloon Land. The kids immediately run off, but a civilian that was standing right next to the gate immediately answered the door with a small door on top of the huge door. The civilian denies the Pincushion's exclamation because he already knew what the Pincushion Man was planning to do. The Pincushion Man then asked something different saying that he wants to give the civilian a surprise. He accepts it and decides to do the unthinkable. After opening the gate to let the Pincushion Man in, he told the man what the surprise was, which is a prank. The Pincushion Man used one of his needles and popped his first civilian. 

Meanwhile, the kids already arrived downtown and immediately witnessed the Pincushion Man's first kill. The kids immediately rush across the street to sound the alarm, which was a crib filled with four babies. As they were drinking milk, the kids pulled the bottles out of their mouths and started to cry, sounding the alarm. The feared balloon people began looking around for danger and began scrambling around to find shelter. As the Pincushion Man arrives downtown, the Pincushion Man immediately tries to take the kids again. The kids tried merging inside the house but ends up taking off their plugs to fit inside the house. After attempting to chase the kids, the Pincushion Man witnessed a man running across the street but gets popped by the Pincushion Man's needle, marking its second death. He threw needles one by one in the streets and immediately pops some of them including a mouse and a caterpillar. While the Pincushion Man attempts to pop more people, the two kids quickly snuck out of the house and rushed to the mayor's office. The little girl tried to escape the boy's arm but can't let go. Rushing inside which sends the guards spinning around, the shocked guards watched the kids from the entrance inside and the kids met the mayor in fear. After the boy immediately lets go of the girl's hand which sends her crashing into the desk, they told the mayor that they saw the Pincushion Man down the street. With the guard yapping "HOLY SMOKES!", an out-of-tune bugle was blown by one of the soldiers. This forced an entire army of Balloon Soldiers to be made and sent downtown. Meanwhile, the Pincushion Man threw some more needles after witnessing the army, popping a few soldiers. Preparing to launch gum bullets at the Pincushion Man, the leader ducks for cover, and the first few gum bullets and golf balls hit the perfect target at the Pincushion Man. War was declared on the Pincushion Man as he tries to take precautions seriously. Shortly after managing to get the gum off of his hands, he was hit with more gum and golf balls, sending him flying forwardly. After getting hit by more gum, he was covered in a big ball of gum, which sends him rolling out of town and into a tree. He managed to pop his last set of flowers while rolling. While trying to survive by holding onto grass, another big ball of gum with a perfect target hits the Pincushion Man and sends him falling out of Earth. With the day saved, Balloon Land was back to normal and the two kids were seen standing on a side of the street, kissing each other as the short ends.

Notable appearances
 Several scenes from "Balloon Land" are shown during the film The Devil’s Gift which was later re-edited into another film Merlin's Shop of Mystical Wonders.
 A portion of it was shown on an episode of Pee-Wee's Playhouse, and it was featured in the 1981 HBO special The Pee-Wee Herman Show.
 The cartoon is also featured in the live revival of Pee-Wee's 2010 stage show at Los Angeles' Club Nokia theater. It is introduced during the first act break by the King of Cartoons.
 Parts of "Balloon Land" are shown in the Shining Time Station music videos: "What Am I Afraid Of?" from the episode: "Scare Dares", and "Bad Guy" from the episode: "Bully for Mr. Conductor".
 In honor to celebrate the 50 greatest shorts of all time, this short was nominated for The 50 Greatest Cartoons.
 Parts of the cartoon are also heard/ seen throughout the 2022 film Skinamarink.

Image gallery

See also
 ComiColor Cartoons
 Ub Iwerks

References

 

1935 animated films
1935 films
1930s color films
Ub Iwerks Studio series and characters
Films directed by Ub Iwerks
Films set in a fictional country
Films scored by Carl Stalling
American animated short films
ComiColor cartoons
1930s American films